Morning Sci-Fi is the second studio album by British electronic music producers Hybrid. The album includes a hidden track titled "Lights Go Down, Knives Come Out," which is hidden before the first indexed track and can be accessed by rewinding.

Track listing

CD: Morning Sci-Fi

DVD: Morning Sci-Fi Bonus DVD
The bonus DVD includes the 40-minute 'Dishing Pump' documentary about their 2000 tour with Moby, interviews, and live concert footage from their performance at Dublin, Ireland in May 2003. The DVD includes a few Easter Eggs.  One of these Easter Eggs is the symphonic instrumental of their song "Finished Symphony" from their first studio album Wide Angle, which can be heard by accessing the Info menu. Another one, an unreleased mix of "Higher Than a Skyscraper", can be accessed by selecting the Interviews menu and selecting the tree branch.

Personnel
 Mike Truman – producing, programming, engineering, mixing (all tracks)
 Chris Healings – producing, programming, engineering, mixing (all tracks)
 Adam Taylor – guitar (tracks 1, 2), vocals (tracks 2, 5, 9, 11)
 Peter Hook – bass guitar (tracks 2, 8)
 Kirsty Hawkshaw – vocals (track 12)

Trivia
"Blackout" is also featured in Kirsty Hawkshaw's second album Meta-Message.
A 9:46 version of "Blackout" is included on Hybrid Present Y4K. It is listed as "Blackout (Hybrid Y4K edit)" and features Kirsty Hawkshaw's vocals over the backing music/beats that Hybrid previously made for their unofficial remix of R.E.M.'s song "The Great Beyond".
"Higher Than a Skyscraper" is featured in the video game Crackdown.
On Hybrid's website, unreleased mixes of "True to Form" and "Higher Than a Skyscraper" as well as the album version of "Lights Go Down, Knives Come Out" can be heard.

Charts

References

External links
Morning Sci-Fi on Discogs

2003 albums
Hybrid (British band) albums
Distinct'ive Records albums